The Trade Union Advisory Committee to the OECD (TUAC) is the interface of the Organisation for Economic Co-operation and Development (OECD) with organized labour. TUAC has 59 affiliated trade union centres in 31 OECD countries, representing more than 66 million workers. It also has associate members in Brazil, Indonesia, Russia and South Africa.

History
In recent years, TUAC has focused on the response to the economic crisis, stressing the need for anti-crisis policies that stimulate growth and protect and create jobs, together with stronger regulation of the financial sector. TUAC calls for a paradigm shift in the underlying economic model so as to deliver a stronger global economy that reduces income inequality. It supports policies that promote aggregate demand, green growth, sustainable and inclusive development, responsible long-term investments and financial markets, as well as fair and progressive tax systems.

To this end, TUAC actively participates in various OECD Committees and conferences, including the OECD Forum and Ministerial Council Meeting.

TUAC, working with the International Trade Union Confederation (ITUC) co-ordinates trade union input to the G20 and G8 Summits through the L20, and took part in the G20 Employment Task Force and Sherpa meetings, as well as in social partners consultations with Ministers and Leaders. It also co-ordinated trade union input in the book Exiting from the crisis: towards a model of more equitable and sustainable growth .

TUAC and its Global Union partners have also contributed to the update of the OECD Guidelines for Multinational Enterprises. TUAC has launched a database and website of trade union cases submitted under the Guidelines since 2000.

Leadership

General Secretaries
1949: Walter Schevenels
1966: Charles Ford
1971: Henri Bernard
1978: Kari Tapiola
1985: John Evans
2017: Pierre Habbard

Presidents
1949: Evert Kupers
1951: Henk Oosterhuis
 Morgues
1966: W. F. van Tilburg
1969: George Lowthian
1973: Svend Bache Vognbjerg
1980: Lennart Bodström
1982: David Basnett
1986: Lane Kirkland
1996: Bob White
2000: John Sweeney
2010: Richard Trumka
2021:  (acting)

References

External links
 
 Labour20 official website

 
International economic organizations
Organizations based in Paris
Trade unions established in 1948